Nurai-ye Now (also Romanized as Nūrā’ī-ye Now; also known as Nīrā’ī, Nīrā’ī-ye Bālā, and Nūrā’ī) is a village in Howmeh Rural District, in the Central District of Lamerd County, Fars Province, Iran. At the 2006 census, its population was 557, in 117 families.

References 

Populated places in Lamerd County